Dwarf sheet spiders (Hahniidae) is a family of araneomorph spiders, first described by Philipp Bertkau in 1878. Unlike many spiders the web does not lead to a retreat. The silk used in these webs is so fine that they are difficult to spot unless they are coated with dew. They greatly favor locations near water or near moss, and are often found in leaf litter and detritus or on the leaves of shrubs and trees.

Description
They are characterized by the arrangement of their six spinnerets in a transverse row. The last segment of the outer spinnerets is quite long and stands out above all the others.

Distribution
Hahniidae are a worldwide family. The genera of the Northern Hemisphere and Africa tend to differ in their genital structures from those of the Southern Hemisphere. Very few species have been described from southeast Asia, although quite a number seems to be yet undescribed.

Name
The family is named after the type genus Hahnia, which is dedicated to German zoologist Carl Wilhelm Hahn.

Genera

, the World Spider Catalog accepts the following genera:

Alistra Thorell, 1894 — Oceania, Asia
Amaloxenops Schiapelli & Gerschman, 1958 — Argentina
Antistea Simon, 1898 — North America, Asia
Asiohahnia Ovtchinnikov, 1992 — Kazakhstan, Kyrgyzstan, China
Austrohahnia Mello-Leitão, 1942 — Argentina
Chorizomma Simon, 1872 — Spain, France
Cicurina Menge, 1871 — North America, Asia
Cybaeolus Simon, 1884 — Chile, Argentina
Hahnia C. L. Koch, 1841 — Africa, Asia, North America, Central America, Europe, South America
Hahniharmia Wunderlich, 2004 — Europe
Harmiella Brignoli, 1979 — Brazil
Iberina Simon, 1881 — Asia, Europe
Intihuatana Lehtinen, 1967 — Argentina
Kapanga Forster, 1970 — New Zealand
Lizarba Roth, 1967 — Brazil
Mastigusa Menge, 1854 — France, Hungary
Neoantistea Gertsch, 1934 — North America, Asia, Costa Rica
Neoaviola Butler, 1929 — Australia
Neohahnia Mello-Leitão, 1917 — South America, Saint Vincent and the Grenadines
Pacifantistea Marusik, 2011 — Russia, Japan
Porioides Forster, 1989 — New Zealand
Rinawa Forster, 1970 — New Zealand
Scotospilus Simon, 1886 — Australia, New Zealand, India

See also
 List of Hahniidae species

References

External links

 
Taxa named by Philipp Bertkau